Performance Freediving International (PFI) is a freediving training agency founded in 2000 by Kirk Krack. Krack coached World Champion Freedivers, Mandy-Rae Cruickshank and Martin Stepanek. PFI teaches freediving clinics around the world and is involved in both team and athlete development. Since 2004, PFI has hosted DejaBlue, which is an international freediving competition.  In July 2019, PFI was purchased by International Training, the owner of companies including Scuba Diving International and Technical Diving International.

Promotional work

In 2008, Cruickshank and Krack trained David Blaine for his appearance on The Oprah Winfrey Show in which he stayed underwater for 17 minutes. PFI Team was responsible for the education and training of David Blaine as well as his safety during the whole event acting as support divers. As David ran into problems with his stunt PFI Team members reacted and pulled him out of the sphere.

Cruickshank and Krack have also worked with Tiger Woods.

Training
PFI offers the following courses.

Diver courses
Snorkeler
Introduction to Freediving
Safe Buddy
Freediver
Immediate Freediver 
Advanced Freediver
Safety Freediver

Professional courses
Freediver Supervisor
Assistant Freediver Instructor
Freediver Instructor
Assistant Immediate Freediver Instructor
Immediate Freediver Instructor

See also

References

External links
 PerformanceFreediving.com

PFI
Underwater diving training organizations